The following is a list of waterfalls by type.

 Plunge: Water descends vertically, losing contact with the bedrock surface.
 Horsetail: Descending water maintains some contact with bedrock.
 Cataract: A large, powerful waterfall.
 Multi-step: A series of waterfalls one after another of roughly the same size each with its own sunken plunge pool.
 Block: Water descends from a relatively wide stream or river.
 Cascade: Water descends a series of rock steps.
 Segmented: Distinctly separate flows of water form as it descends.
 Tiered: Water drops in a series of distinct steps or falls.
 Punchbowl: Water descends in a constricted form and then spreads out in a wider pool.
 Fan: Water spreads horizontally as it descends while remaining in contact with bedrock.

Some waterfalls are also distinct in that they do not flow continuously. Ephemeral waterfalls only flow after a rain or a significant snowmelt.

Plunge
Water descends vertically, losing contact with the bedrock surface.

Australia

Blencoe Falls
Curtis Falls
Dangar Falls
Delaneys Falls
Ellenborough Falls
Fitzroy Falls
Hopetoun Falls
Jim Jim Falls
Millaa Millaa Falls
Philosopher Falls
Purlingbrook Falls
Queen Mary Falls
Tolmer Falls
St Georges Falls
Wallaman Falls
Yabba Falls

Bangladesh
Madhabkunda waterfall

Brazil
Cachoeira da Fumaça
Caracol falls

Canada

Brandywine Falls
Bridal Veil Falls
Chute Kabir Kouba
Grand Falls
Helmcken Falls
Horseshoe Falls
Hunlen Falls
Kakabeka Falls
Panther Falls
Pissing Mare Falls
Sandy Pond Falls
Spahats Creek Falls

Costa Rica
La Fortuna Waterfall
La Paz Waterfall

Estonia
Jägala Waterfall
Keila Waterfall
Valaste Waterfall

Finland

Kitsiputous
Pitsusköngäs

France
Carbet Falls
Trou de Fer

Guyana
Kaieteur Falls

Hungary
Lillafüred

Iceland

Öxarárfoss
Seljalandsfoss
Skógafoss
Svartifoss

India

Nohkalikai Falls, Cherrapunjee- India's highest waterfalls.
Jog Falls
Shivanasamudra Falls

Indonesia

Sipisopiso
Coban Wolu Falls
Coban Rondo Falls
Kapas Biru Falls
Penimbungan Falls
Lembah Anai Falls
Cimahi Falls
Matayangu Falls
Cimarinjung Falls
Merdai Falls
Bajing Falls
Coban Baung Falls
Coban Pelangi Falls

Japan
Hannoki Falls
Kegon Falls
Nachi Falls
Shōmyō Falls

Lesotho
Maletsunyane Falls

Mexico
Basaseachic Falls
Piedra Volada

New Zealand

Bridal Veil Falls
Rainbow Falls
Tutea falls - cataract type waterfall
Wairere Falls

Norway
Kjelfossen
Månafossen
Mardalsfossen
Ringedalsfossen or Skykkjedalsfossen
Rjukan Falls
Skrikjofossen
Tyssestrengene
Vettisfossen

South Africa
Berlin Falls
Mac-Mac Falls
Tugela Falls
Waterfall Bluff

Sri Lanka
Laxapana Falls
Diyaluma falls
babarakanda falls

Taiwan
Jiao Lung Waterfall

Uganda

Sipi Falls

United Kingdom

Devil's Appendix
Ffrwd Fawr Waterfall
Hardraw Force
Melincourt Falls
Pistyll Rhaeadr
Sgwd Henrhyd

United States

Akaka Falls State Park
Bridal Veil Falls (Macon County)
Bridal Veil Falls (Telluride)
Bridal Veil Falls (Washington)
Bridalveil Fall (California)
DeSoto Falls
Douglas Falls
Fall Creek Falls
Feather Falls
Havasu Falls
Hemmed-In-Hollow Falls
High Shoals Falls
Iris Falls
Lake Peigneur Drilling Disaster (Louisiana)
Looking Glass Falls
McWay Falls
Minnehaha Falls
Mooney Falls
Moore Cove Falls
Moose Falls
Noccalula Falls Park
Ozone Falls
Palouse Falls
Pearl Falls
Rainbow Falls
Raven Cliff Falls
Ribbon Fall
Slick Rock Falls
Snoqualmie Falls
Taughannock Falls
Toccoa Falls
Toketee Falls
Tower Fall
Vermillion Falls
Vernal Fall
Virgin Falls
Wailua Falls
Watson Falls
Window Falls
Yahoo Falls
Yellowstone Falls

Venezuela
Angel Falls
Cuquenan Falls

Zambia
Kalambo Falls

Horsetail
Descending water maintains some contact with bedrock.

Australia
Myrtle Forest Falls
Seventh Falls
Silver Falls
Silverband Falls
Steavenson Falls

Bosnia and Herzegovina 
Skakavac

Bulgaria

 Babsko Praskalo – 
 Boyana Waterfall – 
 Goritsa Waterfall – 
 Karlovsko Praskalo – 
 Skakavitsa Waterfall – 
 Vratsa waterfalls
 Skaklia (ephemeral) – 
 Borov Kamak – 
 Raysko Praskalo – , highest waterfall in the Balkans

Canada

Alfred Creek Falls
Bergeron Falls
Bridal Veil Falls
Cascade Falls
Cliff Lake Falls
Crypt Falls
Francis Falls
Gold Creek Falls
James Bruce Falls
Kingcome Valley Falls
Lineham Falls
Michelle Falls
Middle Cummins Falls
Montmorency Falls
Odegaard Falls
Shannon Falls
Snowshoe Creek Falls
Takakkaw Falls
Upper Geraldine Falls
Uisge Ban Falls

Iceland
Glymur
Háifoss

India

Jog Falls
Athirappilly Falls
Duduma Falls
Kedumari Falls
Khandadhar Falls
Manikyadhara Falls
Palaruvi Falls
Rajat Prapat
Sogal
Sweet Falls
Thalaiyar Falls

Ireland
Powerscourt Waterfall

Lesotho
Maletsunyane Falls

New Zealand

Humboldt Falls
Lady Alice Falls
Mount Damper Falls
Wainui Falls

North Macedonia
Smolare Waterfall

Norway

Stalheimsfossen
Vøringfossen
White Drin Waterfall

Philippines

Maria Cristina Falls
Pagsanjan Falls

Slovenia
Sava Bohinjka

South Africa

Howick Falls

Sri Lanka

Aberdeen
Bambarakanda Falls
Diyaluma Falls
Elgin Falls
Rawan Ella

Switzerland
Reichenbach Falls
Staubbach Fall

United Kingdom
Grey Mare's Tail, Conwy
River Lyd
Spout of Garnock

United States

Alamere Falls
Anna Ruby Falls
Cochrans Falls
Courthouse Falls
Darwin Falls
DeSoto Falls
Dick's Creek Falls
Dukes Creek
Fish Creek Falls
Glassmine Falls
Hickory Nut Falls
Hiilawe Waterfall
Holcomb Creek Falls
Makahiku Falls
Minnehaha Falls
Nevada Fall
Rainbow Falls
Silver Strand Falls
Waihilau Falls

Cataract
A large, powerful waterfall.

Democratic Republic of the Congo
Boyoma Falls

Mali
Gouina Falls

Zambia/Zimbabwe
Victoria Falls

India

Chitrakoot Falls
Gokak Falls
Kakolat
Thoovanam Waterfalls
Tirparappu Waterfalls

Indonesia
Banangar Falls
Malela Falls
Temam Falls
Riam Merasap Falls

Argentina/Brazil

Iguaçu Falls

Multi-step 
A series of waterfalls one after another of roughly the same size each with its own sunken plunge pool.

Bulgaria

 Popinolashki waterfall –

Ghana
Kintampo waterfalls

Morocco
Ouzoud Falls

Japan

Fukuroda Falls

Estonia
Jägala Waterfall

Iceland
Dettifoss
Goðafoss
Gullfoss
Selfoss

Block
Water descends from a relatively wide stream or river.

Ethiopia

Blue Nile Falls

Cambodia
Ka Choung

China
Huangguoshu Waterfall

India

Abbey Falls
Aruvikkuzhi Waterfalls
Athirappilly Falls
Teerathgarh Falls

Korea
Cheonjeyeon Waterfall

Zambia
Ngonye Falls

Bosnia and Herzegovina
Pliva Waterfall

Iceland
Faxi
Þjófafoss

Switzerland

Rhine Falls

Turkey
Manavgat Waterfall

United Kingdom
Aysgarth Falls
Cotter Force
Kisdon Force
Low Force

Canada

Bow Falls
Churchill Falls
Fenelon Falls, Ontario
Horseshoe Falls
Niagara Falls
Overlander Falls
Wapta Falls

Mexico

Agua Azul

United States
American Falls
Burgess Falls
Cohoes Falls
Cumberland Falls
Hooker Falls
Niagara Falls
Rainbow Falls
Saint Anthony Falls
Shoshone Falls
Upper Mesa Falls
Willamette Falls

Australia

Bridal Veil Falls
Fernhook Falls
Millstream Falls

Brazil
Guaíra Falls

Cascade
Water descends a series of rock steps.

Australia

Barron Falls
Bloomfield Falls
Dinner Falls
Elabana Falls
Goomoolahra Falls
Josephine Falls
Kearneys Falls
Lobster Falls
Stoney Creek Falls
Surprise Creek Falls
Tully Falls
Lady Barron Falls
Liffey Cascade
Liffey Falls
Balaka Falls
Serpentine Falls

Austria

Krimmler Wasserfälle

Canada

Albion Falls
Alfred Creek Falls
Angel's Staircase Falls
Athabasca Falls
Elbow Falls
Helen Falls
Inglis Falls
Kitchener Creek Falls
Nymph Falls
Pokiok Falls
Sandy Pond Falls
Thunder Falls

China
Hukou Waterfall

Finland
Hepoköngäs

Germany
Triberg Waterfalls

Iceland

Aldeyjarfoss
Barnafossar
Ófærufoss

India

Chunchanakatte Falls
Courtallam
Hanumangundi falls
Irupu Falls
Jog Falls
Kiliyur Falls
Monkey Falls
Siruvani Waterfalls
Thusharagiri Falls
Ullakaarvi
Vazhachal Falls

Jamaica
Dunn's River Falls

Laos

Khone Phapheng Falls

New Zealand

Aniwaniwa Falls
Browne Falls
Huka Falls
Mokau Falls
Purakaunui Falls
Tarawera Falls

North Macedonia
Koprišnica Waterfall

Norway
Kjosfossen
Steinsdalsfossen

Philippines
Tinuy-an Falls

Russia
Kivach waterfall

Sri Lanka
Baker's Falls
Bopath Ella Falls
Ravana Falls
St. Clairs Falls

South Africa

Augrabies Falls

United Kingdom

Catrake Force
Cenarth Falls
Conwy Falls
Falls of Bruar
High Force
Swallow Falls

United States

Batson Creek Falls
Bechler Falls
Big Manitou Falls
Blackwater Falls State Park
Bridal Veil Falls (DuPont State Forest)
Burgess Falls
Cascade Falls
Connestee Falls
Corbin Creek Falls
Crabtree Falls
Cullasaja Falls
Cunningham Falls State Park
Dingmans Falls
Eastatoe Falls
Firehole Falls
Fulmer Falls
Gibbon Falls
Gooseberry Falls
Grand Falls
Hidden Falls
Isaqueena Falls
Kepler Cascades
Key Falls
Lewis Falls
Lower Cascades
Lucifer Falls
McGalliard Falls
Mitchell Falls
Moravian Falls
Mystic Falls
Nugget Falls
'Opaeka'a Falls
Rainbow Falls
Roaring Fork Falls
Setrock Creek Falls
Sliding Rock
Tory's Falls
Triple Falls
Turtleback Falls
Upper Cascades
Upper Whitewater Falls
Virginia Cascades
Walker Falls

Uganda
Murchison Falls

Venezuela
Llovizna Falls

Segmented
Distinctly separate flows of water form as it descends.

Australia
Florence Falls
Guide Falls
Halls Falls
Horseshoe Falls
Nigretta Falls
Pencil Pine Falls
Russell Falls

Bulgaria

 Etropole Waterfall Varovitets – 
 Krushuna Falls –

Canada

Black Brook Waterfall
Cauldron Falls
Churchill Falls
Della Falls
Horseshoe Falls
Icecap Falls
Niagara Falls
Nistowiak Falls
Twin Falls
Virginia Falls

Chile
Laja Falls

China
Detian – Ban Gioc Falls

Colombia
Tequendama Falls

Estonia
Keila Waterfall

Iceland

Dettifoss
Dynjandi
Hraunfossar

India

Agaya Gangai
Athirappilly Falls
Hogenakkal Falls
Keoti Falls
Lushington Falls
Magod Falls
Meenmutty Falls
Sathodi Falls
Shivanasamudra Falls
Suruli Falls
Vattaparai Falls

Iran
Margoon Waterfall

Japan
Ryūzu Falls

Namibia
Ruacana Falls

North Macedonia
Kolešino Waterfall

Norway
Rjukandefossen
Seven Sisters

Thailand
Umphang Thee Lor Sue Waterfall

Turkey

Düden Waterfalls

United Kingdom
Mynach Falls

United States

Blum Basin Falls
Burney Falls
Depot Creek Falls
Dry Falls
Elakala falls
Great Falls
Three Chute Falls

Tiered
Water drops in a series of distinct steps or falls.

Australia

Apsley Falls
Ebor Falls
Lesmurdie Falls
Montezuma Falls
New Town Falls
Second Falls
Tin Mine Falls
Twin Falls
Wentworth Falls
Wollomombi Falls

Belize
Big Rock Falls

Canada

Alexander Falls
Ashlu Falls
Aviron Bay Falls
Bow Glacier Falls
Crescent Falls
Crooked Falls
Cummins Falls
Della Falls
Fairy Creek Falls
Flood Falls
Fossil Falls
Harmony Falls
Helmet Falls
Kerkeslin Falls
Les Sept Chutes
Michael Falls
Moresby Falls
Murchison Falls
Nairn Falls
Peach Creek Falls
Petain Creek Falls
Place Creek Falls
Pyramid Falls
Rattling Brook Falls
Sideways Falls
Silvertip Falls
Whispering Falls

Czech Republic
Pančavský vodopád

France

Gavarnie Falls

Germany
Röthbachfall

India

Barkana Falls
Dudhsagar Falls
Hebbe Falls
Kunchikal Falls
Soochipara Falls

Indonesia
Parangloe Waterfall
Tumpak Sewu Waterfalls

Italy
Cascata delle Marmore
Cascate del Serio

North Macedonia
Roštuše Waterfall

Norway
Langfossen
Låtefossen
Ramnefjellsfossen

Peru
Gocta Cataracts
Yumbilla falls

Sri Lanka
Devon Falls
Dunhinda Falls
Ramboda Falls

Switzerland

Engstligen Falls
Trummelbach Falls

Thailand
Namtok Kaeng Sopha

United Kingdom
Aber Falls
Aira Force
Canonteign Falls
Cautley Spout
Dolgoch Falls
Eas a' Chual Aluinn
Falls of Foyers
Grey Mare's Tail, Llanrwst, Conwy
Moss Force
Pistyll y Llyn
Scale Force
Steall Waterfall

United States

Amicalola Falls State Park
Berdeen Falls
Bonita Falls
Bridal Veil Falls
Calf Creek Falls
Chilnualna Falls
Comet Falls
Eastatoe Falls
Kaaterskill Falls
Kahiwa Falls
Linville Falls
Mazama Falls
Multnomah Falls
Olo'upena Falls
Rainy Lake Falls
Seven Falls
Silverthread Falls
Sulphide Creek Falls
Twister Falls
Yosemite Falls
Zapata Falls

Punchbowl
Water descends in a constricted form and then spreads out in a wider pool.

Australia
Edith Falls
Wangi Falls
Wannon Falls

Bulgaria
 Emen Waterfall

Canada
Keyhole Falls

Iceland
Gjáin
Hjálparfoss

Japan
Nunobiki Falls

Korea
Cheonjiyeon Waterfall
Jeongbang Waterfall

Philippines
Camaya Falls

United Kingdom
Janet's Foss

United States
Metlako Falls
Punch Bowl Falls

Fan
Water spreads horizontally as it descends while remaining in contact with bedrock.

Australia
Dip Falls
Nelson Falls

Canada
Chatterbox Falls

Japan
Yudaki Falls

Mexico
Cola de Caballo

Philippines
Tinago Falls

United States
Falling Waters Falls
High Falls
Nugget Falls
Turner Falls
Union Falls

Ephemeral
Ephemeral waterfalls flow only after periods of heavy rain or significant snowmelt.

United States
Horsetail Fall

Bulgaria
Vrachanska Skaklya (141 m)

See also

Waterfall#Types
List of waterfalls
List of waterfalls by height
List of waterfalls by flow rate

References

External links
World waterfall database

Type